Camore is a small hamlet, located 0.5 mile directly southeast of Evelix, and 1.5 miles west of Dornoch, in south east Sutherland, Scottish Highlands and is in the Scottish council area of Highland. The name comes from the Gaelic cadha mòr meaning "big path" or "big passage". The hamlet is purely residential.

References

Populated places in Sutherland